Atul Garg (born 26 August 1957) is an Indian politician from Ghaziabad who is a Minister of State in the Government of Uttar Pradesh. He is a Member of the Uttar Pradesh Legislative Assembly, representing the Ghaziabad Assembly constituency.

Political career
Garg is a member of the Bhartiya Janta Party. He campaigned for the Uttar Pradesh legislative assembly elections in 2012 without winning a seat, but following the 2017 election he joined the assembly. He is a Minister of State responsible for food and civil supplies, food safety, rent control, and consumer protection.

Background 

Garg is the son of Dinesh Chandra Garg, the first mayor of Ghaziabad.

Garg is a promoter of Entrepreneurship Education in Engineering & Management Colleges in Uttar Pradesh. Through various colleges, he has been promoting trainings in entrepreneurship and skill development.

References

Living people
Politicians from Ghaziabad
Uttar Pradesh MLAs 2017–2022
Bharatiya Janata Party politicians from Uttar Pradesh
State cabinet ministers of Uttar Pradesh
Yogi ministry
People from Ghaziabad, Uttar Pradesh
1957 births
Uttar Pradesh MLAs 2022–2027